Pondicherry District (French: Réseau routier du district de Pondichéry) is one of the four districts of Puducherry Union Territory. It has extensive road network. Every village of Pondicherry district is connected by an all-weather metalled road.

Types of roads

List of National Highways (NH)

List of State Highways (SH)

RC Roads are the major roads in Puducherry District designated with numbering. RC Roads can be compared with State Highways. There are 33 RC roads in Puducherry District.

Other District Roads (ODR)

Rural Roads [Village Roads] (VR)

See also
 Puducherry road network
 Road network in Karaikal District
 Road network in Yanam District
 Road network in Mahe District

References

External links
 Official website of Public Works Department, Puducherry UT

Roads in Puducherry
Puducherry district